Mohammad Ali Forghani is the administrator of the Iranian Space Agency. He is one of the deputies of the Ministry of Communication and Information Technology.

Career
 Managing Director of Telecommunication Industries Co.
 Managing Director of electronics industries of Iran
 Member of Electronics Industries council
 Board member of Iran Electronic Development Co.
 Board member Fars Industrial Development Consortium

Education
 Master's degree in System Management and productivity from Iran University of Science and Technology
 Ph.D. in Strategic Management

External links
ISA biography

Living people
1957 births
People from Yazd
Administrators of the Iranian Space Agency